Dilbagh is a given name. Notable people with the name include:

 Dilbagh Singh, Indian air marshal
 Dilbagh Singh Athwal, Indian geneticist, plant breeder and agriculturist
 Dilbagh Singh (singer) , Punjabi language singer-songwriter and film actor
 Dilbagh Singh Kler, Malaysian middle-distance runner
 Dilbag Singh, Indian boxer